The Kundaram Formation is a geological formation in India, located within the Pranhita–Godavari Basin. The unit is between 250–400 metres thick and at its base consists of sandstone-mudstone alterations, followed by a sequence dominated by red mudstone with infrequent sandstone lens beds, with minor ferruginous shale within the sandstones. It was deposited in fluvial conditions. It is considered to be Late Permian in age. An abundant terrestrial fauna is known from nodules found near the village of Golleti in the Adilabad district of Telangana, the only such fauna known from the Permian of India. The fauna found includes the dicynodonts Endothiodon, Dicynodontoides, Pristerodon and Sauroscaptor, as well as a small captorhinid and an indeterminate medium-sized gorgonopsid.

References 

Lopingian geology
Geology of India
Permian India